"Can't Live with You, Can't Live Without You" is a duet between Billy Newton-Davis and Celine Dion, released as a single in July 1989 in Canada. The song was featured on Newton-Davis' album Spellbound. "Can't Live with You, Can't Live Without You" was later included on Dion's Japanese maxi-single "Unison" (1991). It was written by Dan Hill who also wrote for Dion "Seduces Me" on her 1996 album Falling into You.

Background
The "Can't Live with You, Can't Live Without You" music video received a MuchMusic Video Award for Best MOR Video in 1990.

The song was Dion's second commercial English single after her 1985 "Listen to the Magic Man". It reached number 41 on the Canadian Singles Chart and number 12 on the Adult Contemporary Chart. In Quebec, it peaked at number 19.

Dion performed this song during her Unison Tour.

Track listings and formats
Canadian 7" single
"Can't Live with You, Can't Live Without You" – 4:16
"Stop Me (Before I Dream Again)" – 3:40

Charts

Release history

References

1989 singles
1989 songs
Celine Dion songs
Columbia Records singles
Songs written by Dan Hill
Male–female vocal duets
Songs written by Steve Kipner